The Teatro Verdi is a theater and opera house in Padova, Italy named after composer Giuseppe Verdi.  Constructed in 1749–1751, the theater was inaugurated in 1751. It was modernized in 1884.

References

External links
Official Website of the Teatro Verdi Padova

Opera houses in Italy
1751 establishments in Italy
Culture in Padova
Theatres in Padova